VNPF may refer to:

 Vanuatu National Provident Fund
 Vietnamese Nôm Preservation Foundation